Bus Simulator is a vehicle-simulation video game series developed by Icebytes, Contendo Media, TML Studios and Stillalive Studios, and published by Astragon Entertainment. The franchise was introduced in 2007 by Astragon Entertainment. The latest installment, titled Bus Simulator 21, has been announced and was released on September the 7th 2021.

Games

Bus Simulator 16 (2016)

The fourth video game in the series was announced in July 2015. The game was scheduled to release on 20 January 2016 for Microsoft Windows and macOS, but it was postponed to 3 March 2016 due to technical issues.

Bus Simulator 18 (2018)

The fifth installment in the series was revealed in May 2018.  It was available for Microsoft Windows on 13 June 2018 worldwide.  The release of the PlayStation 4 and Xbox One versions followed in August 2019 under the title Bus Simulator.

Bus Simulator 21 (2021)

The sixth installment in the series was revealed on 11 August 2020.  It was released for Microsoft Windows, PlayStation 4 and Xbox One on 7 September 2021. PlayStation 5 and Xbox Series X/S versions are due to available on 23 May 2023.

Bus Simulator City Ride (2022)

Bus Simulator City Ride was announced on 2 June 2022. It was released for Android, iOS and Nintendo Switch on October 13, 2022.

References

External links 

  

 
Bus simulation video games
Video game franchises introduced in 2007
Video game franchises